Angelo Infanti (16 February 1939 – 12 October 2010) was an Italian film actor. He appeared in more than 90 films between 1961 and 2010. He was born on 16 February 1939 in Zagarolo, Italy. He died on 12 October 2010 in Tivoli, Italy due to cardiac arrest.

Infanti is best known to non-Italian audiences as Fabrizio in The Godfather.  Fabrizio was a bodyguard to Michael Corleone who was hiding in Sicily.  Fabrizio betrays Michael by setting up explosives in his car, but kills his new bride instead. In the novel, Fabrizio is later shot dead in revenge for the killing. A scene was filmed of him being killed by the Corleones using a car bomb but was cut from the motion picture before its theatrical release.  It appears in the 1977 The Godfather:  A Novel for Television, which combined the first two films – The Godfather and The Godfather Part II, adding back scenes that had been previously cut and telling the story chronologically beginning with Vito Andolini's childhood in Sicily.

Filmography

 Io bacio... tu baci (1961)
 Beautiful Families (1964) - (segment "Il principe azzurro")
 Bianco, rosso, giallo, rosa (1964) - Un cortigiano
 Con rispetto parlando (1965)
 La ragazzola (1965) - Alberto
 4 Dollars of Revenge (1966) - Barry Haller
 Secret Agent Super Dragon (1966)
 Ischia operazione amore (1966) - Peppiniello Capatosta
 Ballad of a Gunman (1967) - Hud
 Tiffany Memorandum (1967) - Pedro Almereyda / Max Schultz
 Gungala, the Black Panther Girl (1968) - Morton
 Silvia e l'amore (1968)
 Amore o qualcosa del genere (1968) - Bruno
 Le 10 meraviglie dell'amore (1969) - Pericle
 The Appointment (1969) - Antonio
 Le lys de mer (1969)
 Children of Mata Hari (1970) - Jean / Gianni
 The Breach (1970) - Le docteur Blanchard
 Fragment of Fear (1970) - Bruno
 A Man Called Sledge (1970) - Prisoner (uncredited)
 Le Juge (1971) - Buck Carson
 Le Mans (1971) - Lugo Abratte
 Io non vedo, tu non parli, lui non sente (1971) - Claude Parmentier
 A Girl in Australia (1971) - Carmela's pimp
 The Valachi Papers  (1972) - Lucky Luciano
 This Kind of Love (1972) - Bernardo
 The Godfather  (1972) - Fabrizio - Sicilian Sequence
 Les hommes (1973) - Ange Leoni
 Piedone lo sbirro - Flatfoot, The Knock Out Cop (1973) - Ferdinando Scarano "O'Barone"
 War Goddess (1973) - Theseus
 Giuda uccide il venerdì (1974)
 And Now My Love (1974) - A Stud
 The Girl in Room 2A (1974) - Frank Grant
 Black Emanuelle (1975) - Gianni Danieli
 The Count of Monte Cristo (1975) - Jacopo
 Jackpot (1975)
 Soldier of Fortune (1976) - Graziano d'Asti
  (1976) - Nino Andreotti
 Black Emanuelle 2 (1976) - Paul
 The Black Corsair (1976) - Morgan
 Highway Racer (1977) - Jean-Paul Dossena / il Nizzardo
 The Rip-Off (1978) - Inspector
 The Face with Two Left Feet (1979) - Raoul
 Ammazzare il tempo (1979)
 Flatfoot in Egypt (1979) - Hassan
 Savage Breed (1980) - Carlo Esposito
 Bianco, rosso e Verdone (1981) - Playboy
 The Dirty Seven (1982) - Falk
 Talcum Powder  (1982) - Cesare Cuticchia / Manuel Fantoni
 Journey with Papa (1992) - Gianni
 Attila flagello di Dio (1982) - Fusco Cornelio
 The Scarlet and the Black  (1983) - Father Morosini
 The Story of Piera (1983) - Tito / Giasone
 The Black Stallion Returns (1983) - Raj's Father
 The Assisi Underground  (1985) - Giorgio Kropf
 Vediamoci chiaro (1985) - Gianluca
 Una spina nel cuore (1986) - Roberto Dionisotti
 The Inquiry (1986) - Trifone
 L'estate sta finendo (1987) - Antonio Bonomiti
 Sottozero (1987) - Antonio
 Netchaïev est de retour (1991) - Joseph
 Money (1991) - Romano
 The Escort (1993) - Judge Barresi
 Alto rischio (1993) - Sjberg
 La Vengeance d'une blonde (1994) - Giacomo Contini
 Carogne (1995) - Don Alfredo
 Diapason (2001) - Marcello
 The Nest (2002) - Abedin Nexhep
 The Cruelest Day (2003) - Marocchino
 Il punto rosso (2006) - Burattinaio
 Il seme della discordia (2008) - Veronica's Father
 Many Kisses Later (2009) - Padre di Elisa
 Letters to Juliet (2010) - Chess Playing Lorenzo
 Backward (2010) - Luigi
 Prigioniero di un segreto (2010)

References

External links

1939 births
2010 deaths
Italian male film actors
People from the Metropolitan City of Rome Capital
David di Donatello winners
People of Lazian descent